Carnival Cinemas is a multiplex chain in India in 120 cities at 162 locations with over 470 operational screens. Carnival Cinemas caters to over 5 crore patrons annually and has a total seating capacity of over 1,50,000. Carnival Cinemas has recently added two more properties into the overseas market with opening of four new screens in Singapore with a total of 6 screens there. Their vision is to hold 1000 screens globally by 2020.

Growth Story 
In India, Carnival Cinemas is in 20 prominent states: Kerala, Chhattisgarh, Karnataka, Tamil Nadu, Andhra Pradesh, Telangana, Maharashtra, Madhya Pradesh, Rajasthan, Punjab, Gujarat, Haryana, Delhi NCR, Jharkhand, Uttar Pradesh, Uttarakhand, West Bengal, Assam, Bihar, Himachal Pradesh and Goa.

Carnival Cinemas has signed MoUs with Governments of Jharkhand and Odisha in order to set up 75 theatres-cum-recreation zones and 150 screens in the respective states. Carnival group confirmed in July 2018 that it will acquire Elan Group's 100 per cent stake in Novo Cinemas United Arab Emirates and the Kingdom of Bahrain but the deal has not been completed as of August 2019.

Carnival Cinemas which earlier planned to double its screen count to 1000 screens by 2020, plans to reach that by 2023.

Carnival Cinemas operates two properties in Pune, Maharashtra owned by E-Square Leisure Private Limited.

Carnival Cinemas, through branding collaboration with Louis Entertainment, a North-east cinemas consultant and management group had itself launched in Assam and Arunachal Pradesh.

Carnival Cinema is a part of Carnival Group India, a well-known Business chain which is headed by Shrikant Bhasi.

Other Initiatives 

 Carnival Cinemas, had started initiative, direct from farm to home delivery, under brand name "Farmse Fresh", to support as livelihood source for their staff during Covid lockdown.

See also 

 Shrikant Bhasi

References

External links
 Carnival Cinemas official website

 Cinema chains in India
 Companies based in Kochi
Entertainment companies established in 2010
2010 establishments in Kerala